Johann "Jack" Katoll (June 24, 1875 in Finckenstein, Prussia – June 18, 1955 in Woodstock, Illinois), was a professional baseball pitcher who played in the Major Leagues from 1898 to 1902. He would play for the Chicago Orphans, Chicago White Sox, and Baltimore Orioles.

External links

1875 births
1955 deaths
Major League Baseball pitchers
Chicago Orphans players
Chicago White Sox players
Baltimore Orioles (1901–02) players
19th-century baseball players
Fall River Indians players
Taunton Herrings players
Hartford Cooperatives players
Newark Colts players
St. Paul Apostles players
St. Paul Saints (Western League) players
Chicago White Stockings (minor league) players
Minneapolis Millers (baseball) players
Major League Baseball players from Germany
People from Woodstock, Illinois
Polish baseball players
Emigrants from the German Empire to the United States